

Class-A European routes

Class-B European routes

See also

External links

Bundesministerium für Verkehr und digitale Infrastruktur

 
E-roads
Germany